Carlos Meléndez Chaverri (23 June 1926 – 12 June 2000) was a Costa Rican historian. Meléndez was the son of Saturnino Lizano and Chaverri Orfilia Chacon. He married María Lourdes Doubles Umaña, who bore him five children: Silvia María, Lucia, Diego, Alberto and Pablo Meléndez Doubles. He won the Magón National Prize for Culture in 1993.

Education
He began his primary studies at the Escuela Argentina, and continued them at the Central School of Puntarenas. His father Don Saturnino moved the Meléndez family then moved to Limon, where he finished his primary education at the School Tomás Guardia. After spending a year in that province, the family returned to Hall where he entered the Ecole Normale de Costa Rica, being a student of renowned professors such as Fernando Vargas Fernández Gámez Solano Uladislaus "Don Lalo" and Marco Tulio Salazar Salazar. On 13 December 1946, Carlos Meléndez concluded secondary education, having passed exams in high school. He earned a BA in Literature and Philosophy with a major in History and Geography in 1952 at the University of Costa Rica [1].

Work
His first job was at the Normal School (later Liceo de Heredia) between the years 1948 to 1953. He was founding director of the Liceo Nocturno Alfredo González F. Heredia, a post he held from 1953 to 1960. In those same years he was Head of the Section of Anthropology and History National Museum of Costa Rica. He joined as a professor at the University of Costa Rica since 1958 and in 1960 became a full professor along with Sam Parr. He was Director of the Department of History and Geography (now School of the Faculty of Social Sciences), University of Costa Rica between 1960 and 1969. His biggest title was the Professor. She worked there until 1986 when it was pensioned. He was Ambassador to Costa Rica in Spain from 1985 to 1986.

Foreign Studies
Historical research conducted in 1965 in Guatemala City, with a grant from the OAS in 1973 and lived in Spain as the scholarship, for research in the Archivo de Indias in Seville, the Historical Archive and the National Academy of History in Madrid.

References

1926 births
2000 deaths
People from Heredia Province
Costa Rican historians
Ambassadors of Costa Rica to Spain
20th-century historians
20th-century Costa Rican writers